Kalyanam Seydhuko is a 1955 Indian Tamil-language film directed by R. Sundar. The film stars P. S. Govindan and Girija.

Plot

Cast 
List adapted from Film News Anandan's database.

P. S. Govindan
Girija
Venkataraman
M. S. S. Baghyam
A. Karunanidhi
K. S. Angamuthu
V. S. Raghavan
Pandanallur Lakshmi

Soundtrack 
Music was composed by Ramaneekaran while the lyrics were penned by Ka. Mu. Sheriff and Kalyan.

References

External links 
 

1950s Tamil-language films